St Peter's Church is a medieval church in the village of Newborough, Anglesey, Wales. The building dates from the early 14th century and underwent restorations in the 19th century. It was designated a Grade II*-listed building on 30 January 1968. It has an interesting history and is the longest church on Anglesey.

History and location
St Peter's Church is situated in the western side of the village of Newborough, in the Isle of Anglesey. The church was originally known as Llananno. Some people believe that it was founded in about 500 AD by a noble couple, Amon of Dyfed and his wife Anna of Gwynedd. They were the parents of Saint Sampson, the abbot and patron saint of Caldey Island in Pembrokeshire. Others say the church was dedicated to Saint Amo, sharing its dedication with St Anno's Church, Llananno in Radnorshire. Whatever the facts of the matter, the church is situated beside Llys Rhosyr, the Anglesey residence of the Princes of Gwynedd, and is likely to have been associated with the royal court.

It is thought that the chancel was built first, serving as a royal chapel, and dedicated to St Mary. Later a separate chapel was built end to end with it, and dedicated to St Peter. Later these two buildings were united into one long building, the longest church in Anglesey. There are differences in roof height, roof structure and stonework between the two parts.

The oldest parts of the church are the eastern side of the chancel and nave, which date from the early 14th century. The nave was extended to the west in either the late 15th or early 16th century. The structure was restored in 1850 and again in 1886. It was granted Grade II*-listed status on 30 January 1968, being considered to be a good example of a restored late medieval church. Interesting features include a twelfth century font and a pair of fourteenth century gravestones.

References

External links
 

14th-century church buildings in Wales
Grade II* listed churches in Anglesey